Guardians is a 2017 Russian superhero film directed by Russian-Armenian filmmaker Sarik Andreasyan and starring Sebastien Sisak, Anton Pampushnyy, Sanzhar Madiyev, Alina Lanina, Valeriya Shkirando and Stanislav Shirin.

The film tells the story of a team of Soviet superheroes created during the Cold War. The team includes representatives of the different nationalities of the USSR. Each of the protagonists' superpowers reflect the strengths and traditions of the people of the USSR.

Guardians was met with strongly negative critical reception in Russian media, with many considering it to be one of the worst films ever made. It debuted atop the Russian box office, however its gross quickly dropped, and Guardians is believed to be a box office bomb.

The film was released in the United States with an English dub by Shout! Factory on 5 December 2017.

Plot 

During the Cold War, a secret organization known as "Patriot" gathers a team of Soviet superheroes, altering and augmenting the DNA of many selected individuals to defend the motherland from superhuman threats. The team includes representatives of the different nationalities of the Soviet Union. Arseniy, codenamed Arsus, can change into a huge, incredibly strong bear-man. Temirkhan, codenamed Khan, has super speed and wields a pair of curved swords. Lernik, codenamed Ler, has the ability to control earth and stone. Finally, Xenia can become invisible underwater.

The program succeeds where a second program called Module-1 fails. This prompts Professor Avgust Kuratov, creator of Module-1, to flee to the remote wilderness, away from Soviet authorities, to continue working on his experiments. When the military is summoned to arrest him, he bombs the Patriot laboratory, surviving because he was covered with some chemicals. He rebuilds his damaged body, making himself into a cyborg. This gives him the power to generate electricity and control machines. He also created an army of clones of himself and sets out to prove to the world that he is a genius. After the explosion, Arsus, Ler, Khan, and Xenia go into hiding for years.

In the present day, several walking robots used in a training exercise turn against their supervising officials and kill them. This leads to the Ministry of Defence holding a meeting and deciding to revive the Patriot organization under the leadership of Major Elena Larina and to locate their missing super agents. She finds Ler spending his time meditating in Armenia; Khan living on the steppes of Kazakhstan; Arsus in a remote cabin in northern Siberia; and Xenia performing stunts in a circus in Moscow. Their first task is to raid Kuratov's laboratory within an old factory, but they are captured.

Kuratov offers the Guardians a chance to join him but they refuse. This angers him and he keeps three of them trapped within a magnetic force field and injures Ler. He later goes to a military facility at Noginsk to take control of the tanks and other vehicles stationed there. Using them, he launches an invasion of Moscow and makes preparations to use the Ostankino Tower and the Federation Tower for his Module-2 Project. He intends to transmit a signal through an old Soviet satellite, which will then be sent to every other satellite orbiting Earth, and use it to seize control of all technology in the world. He uses a force field to protect his beacon tower and destroy several jet fighters that are sent to stop him. When a collaborator within the Russian military, Major-General Nikolai Dolgov, asks Kuratov for a reward for his help, Kuratov strangles him to death.

Major Elena frees the other team members from Kuratov's laboratory. She sends Kuratov's former rival to study one of Kuratov's clones. Unfortunately, the real Kuratov releases poison gas to kill him. Arsus and the other Guardians are trained in the Patriots' facility and are given suits and weapons.

The Guardians go to Moscow: Xenia and Arsus advance through the streets, Ler defeats several soldiers patrolling an underground car park, and Khan uses an airplane to try to fly above Kuratov's force field. The three Guardians enter a shopping mall, and begin crossing an iron bar linking it to the tower-beacon, but are shot at by more of Kuratov's troops on another pipe. Khan jumps from the airplane swinging on a grapple line to slice the pipe, causing Kuratov's troops to fall.

While the other Guardians try to figure out a way to destroy the power source for Kuratov's beacon, Xenia grabs the power source to short circuit it. She is injured but manages to temporarily disable the beacon's transmissions, causing the force field to collapse. The Guardians battle Kuratov again on top of the tower but fail to defeat him. Khan uses his super-speed to tie all of the Guardians to a grappling rope and attach it to an airplane to escape. Kuratov interferes with the plane's controls, but Khan cuts the grappling rope, and they fall into a river before the plane crashes.

As they emerge from the river, they consider going back to Kuratov's beacon to destroy it and kill Kuratov, but Major Elena arrives and commands them not to. Telling them that as superhumans, they can pool their energy and release it as a blast, but doing so might be fatal. The Guardians touch each other and generate a blast of energy that destroys Kuratov's tower and the skyscrapers supporting it, causing Kuratov to fall to his death. Major Elena says that, while Kuratov boasted that he created the Guardians, they really created themselves.

The Guardians recover, rendezvousing with Major Elena in the rebuilt Moscow. Although they choose to go back to their normal lives, they also consider continuing their service to the Patriot organization. As they walk away, Elena tells them that "we found other Guardians." In a post-credits scene, Elena is seen attacking a soldier after his truck stops. When she questions the soldier, he tells her that "Ferrum" has sent him as part of an unspecified mission.

Cast
 Sebastien Sisak as Ler. "Ler" (լեռ) is Armenian for mountain
 Anton Pampushnyy as Arsus
 Sanjar Madi as Khan
 Alina Lanina as Xenia
 Valeriya Shkirando as Major Elena Larina, the head of the secret organization, codenamed "Patriot"
 Vyacheslav Razbegaev as Major-general Nikolai Dolgov
 Stanislav Shirin as Professor Avgust Kuratov

Production

Filming
Filming began on 27 April 2015, in Moscow while the casting process was concluded earlier that year. Filming was continued in Moscow Oblast and in the Crimean Peninsula, and was wrapped on 14 July 2015.

Marketing 
The first trailer was released online in September 2016. Character descriptions were also released up to release which highlighted each team member's connection with a major ethnicity within Russia.

Outside Russia 
The film attracted significant online attention outside of Russia despite no theatrical releases planned for outside territories. Comparisons to Marvel superhero films The Avengers and Guardians of the Galaxy were often made, with Arsus, who can transform into a Bear, receiving a significant level of attention.

Reception

The reception of Guardians was overwhelmingly negative. The film was almost universally panned in Russian media, such as Meduza, Afisha, Rossiyskaya Gazeta, and Mir Fantastiki, among others. It was mainly criticized for having a derivative plot, bad acting and direction, cheap CGI, plot holes and overall low quality, as well as comparisons of the film to Fantastic Four, another film that was critically panned. Critics outside Russia were only slightly kinder to Guardians; however, the reviews in The Times of India, Birth Movies Death and Mid-Day were negative. In November 2017, RIA Novosti placed Guardians at the top of their list of the worst films of all time.

Box office
Guardians was released 23 February 2017, on a public holiday in Russia, Defender of the Fatherland Day. On its first day, the movie grossed 83 million RUB, and 213 million RUB in first four days, below early expectations, but still at the top of the weekend box office. On its second weekend, Guardians box office dropped 90% down to 21 million RUB, and fourth place. The gross kept dropping by 90% every weekend, and Russian media presumes that Guardians became a box office bomb.

In July 2017, Enjoy Movies, the production company behind Guardians, filed for bankruptcy, while Cinema Foundation of Russia, which provided part of the budget, sued the company, defending the jury in the name of national rights.

Home media 
In the United Kingdom, it was 2017's third best-selling foreign language film on home video, below Operation Chromite and Your Name.

Canceled sequel
Initially, long before the premiere of the original film and in case of success, a sequel was announced, in which it was supposed to add another superhero from China. Prior to this, the release date of the second part has not yet been announced. Later, Guardians 2 has been approved, with Turbo Films, the Chinese distributor of the first film, as a co-production company. It would have reportedly be partially shot in China and have some Chinese characters.

After the critical and commercial failure and declaration of bankruptcy by "Enjoy Movies", director Andreasyan said that he was discussing the sequel with the team, and that they were thinking about "Which of the superheroes to kill :)". The film would also be filmed in conjunction with the "Big Cinema", also founded by the brothers Andreasyans.

On 20 December 2020, in an interview with “Bubble Comics” Sarik Andreasyan was asked why “Guardians 2” never came out and the latter explained that “Deadpool 2 was to blame for everything."

Tie-in media 
Prior to the release of the film, a prequel comic was freely distributed at Comic Con Russia in 2016, titled Guardians: Book 1 and containing the story Guardians: The Broken Curtain and lacking any author credits. The comic depicts the Guardians trying to stop a supervillain named "Manowar" from assassinating the Soviet leader Leonid Brezhnev. Despite several thousand copies of the comic being published and distributed in promotion of the film, suggesting an official release, Andreasyan later claimed via Twitter that the comic was a non-canon fan release. Instead, Andreasyan officially sanction another prequel comic book, which was later published, titled Guardians: A Comic of the New Superhero Universe. Both comics were negatively received by critics, who found the story, the dialogue, and especially the artwork to be sub-par.

A tie-in prose novel titled Guardians: The Reflection was published as well. Written by multiple authors, it contained several separate stories focusing on the main characters of the film.

An iOS game titled Guardians - Defence of Justice was released, in which players fight off hordes of attacking enemies.

See also
 List of films considered the worst

References

External links
 
 
  Official page  in Enjoy Movies website

2017 films
2010s Russian-language films
2017 science fiction action films
2010s science fiction adventure films
2010s fantasy action films
2010s dystopian films
2010s superhero films
Films set in Armenia
Films set in Kazakhstan
Films set in Moscow
Films set in Siberia
Films set in the 1980s
Mad scientist films
Films using motion capture
Russian science fiction action films
Russian science fiction adventure films
Science fantasy films
Russian fantasy action films
Russian superhero films
Russian alternate history films
Russian films about revenge
Internet memes introduced from Russia
Internet memes introduced in 2017